Éamonn Scallan (born 1971 in Castletown, County Wexford) is an Irish former hurler who played for his local club Ferns St Aidan's and at senior level for the Wexford county team in the 1990s and 2000s.

In November 2018, Scallan was appointed as Wicklow senior hurling team manager. His time as Wicklow hurling manager came to an end in 2022.

References

 

1971 births
Living people
All-Ireland Senior Hurling Championship winners
Ferns St Aidan's hurlers
Hurling managers
Wexford inter-county hurlers